Uberlino Mesa Estepa (born June 12, 1971 in Nobsa, Boyacá) is a male professional road cyclist from Colombia. He is the older brother of Ubaldo Mesa.

Career

1997
1st in General Classification Vuelta a Chiriquí (PAN)
2000
1st in General Classification Vuelta a Cundinamarca (COL)
7th in General Classification Vuelta a Colombia (COL)
2003
2nd in Tuta (COL)
3rd in Circuito de Combita (COL)
1st in Stage 13 Vuelta a Colombia, Cali (COL)
2004
1st in Stage 6 Clásico RCN, Sabaneta (COL)
2005
1st in Stage 11 Vuelta a Colombia, Mariquita (COL)
2007
1st in Circuito de Combita (COL)
1st in Stage 2 Vuelta a Boyacà, Paipa (COL)
3rd in General Classification Vuelta a Boyacà (COL)
1st in Stage 4 Clásico RCN, Envigado (COL)
10th in General Classification Clásico RCN (COL)
2008
3rd in Tuta (COL)
2nd in General Classification Clásica Nacional Ciudad de Anapoima (COL)
1st in Stage 1 Vuelta a Cundinamarca, Cogua (COL)
1st in Stage 5 Vuelta a Boyacà, Jenesano (COL)
3rd in General Classification Vuelta a Boyacà (COL)

References
 

1971 births
Living people
People from Nobsa
Colombian male cyclists
Vuelta a Colombia stage winners
Sportspeople from Boyacá Department